Sergi Enrich Ametller (born 26 February 1990) is a Spanish professional footballer who plays as a forward for Real Oviedo.

He made 197 total appearances for Eibar, scoring 39 goals. In La Liga, he also represented Mallorca, where he started his career.

Club career

Mallorca
Enrich was born in Ciutadella de Menorca, Menorca, Balearic Islands. A product of RCD Mallorca's youth ranks, he made his first-team – and La Liga – debut on 24 January 2010, playing the last 22 minutes in a 1–1 away draw against RCD Espanyol after coming on as a substitute for Fernando Varela. He spent the vast majority of his first professional season with the reserve team in the Segunda División B.

Enrich spent the 2011–12 campaign on loan to Recreativo de Huelva of the Segunda División. The following year, he moved to AD Alcorcón on the same basis.

Numancia
In the summer of 2013, Enrich signed a two-year contract with CD Numancia still in the second tier. He was the Segunda División Player of the Month in November of the following year as his five goals in four games took the Soria-based club out of the relegation places; on 20 December, he contributed a brace to a 6–6 home draw against CD Lugo.

Eibar
On 12 July 2015, Enrich moved to top-flight SD Eibar on a two-year deal. He scored 11 goals in his second season, helping to a tenth-place finish.

Enrich remained in the Basque Country the following years, signing extensions in February 2017 and May 2019, tying him to them until June 2022.

Due to a clause in his contract allowing him to leave Eibar in case of relegation, Enrich ended his six-year stay in June 2021. Later that summer, he was near to a move to newly relegated 2. Bundesliga team FC Schalke 04 in Germany, but the move was called off when fans rebelled over his criminal record.

Ponferradina
On 22 September 2021, Enrich agreed to a deal at SD Ponferradina, recently returned to the second tier. He contributed six goals and as many assists in his only campaign, and then turned down a new contract.

Oviedo
Enrich signed a one-year contract with Real Oviedo on 18 July 2022.

Personal life
In October 2016, Enrich and teammate Antonio Luna apologised when a sex tape involving them and a woman went viral on the Internet. Due to the woman's lack of consent to the filming, the pair were given two-year prison sentences in January 2021, suspended due to their lack of prior criminal records.

References

External links

1990 births
Living people
People from Ciutadella de Menorca
Spanish footballers
Footballers from Menorca
Association football forwards
La Liga players
Segunda División players
Segunda División B players
Tercera División players
RCD Mallorca B players
RCD Mallorca players
Recreativo de Huelva players
AD Alcorcón footballers
CD Numancia players
SD Eibar footballers
SD Ponferradina players
Real Oviedo players
Spain youth international footballers